Vice-Admiral Sir Cameron Rusby  (20 February 1926 – 6 September 2013) was a Royal Navy officer who served as Deputy Supreme Allied Commander Atlantic.

Naval career 
Educated at the Royal Naval College, Dartmouth, Rusby joined the Royal Navy in February 1945. He served in the closing stages of World War II before being given command of the frigate HMS Ulster in 1958. He became Executive Officer on HMY Britannia in 1962, Deputy Director of Naval Signals in 1965 and Commanding Officer of the frigate HMS Tartar in 1969. He went on to be Deputy Assistant Chief of Staff (Plans and Policy) to the Supreme Allied Commander-in-Chief Southern Europe in 1969, Senior Naval Officer West Indies in 1972 and Assistant Chief of Defence Staff (Operations) in 1974. His last appointments were as Flag Officer Scotland and Northern Ireland in 1977 and Deputy Supreme Allied Commander Atlantic in 1980 before retiring in 1982. He died on 6 September 2013.

Family 
In 1948 he married Marion Bell, with whom he had two daughters.

References 

|-

1926 births
2013 deaths
Graduates of Britannia Royal Naval College
Knights Commander of the Order of the Bath
Lieutenants of the Royal Victorian Order
Royal Navy vice admirals
Royal Navy officers of World War II